In the National Hockey League (NHL), the phrase "50 goals in 50 games" (50-in-50) refers to a player scoring 50 goals within the first 50 (or fewer) games of his team's season. An extremely rare feat, the NHL has only officially deemed five players in eight different seasons to have reached the mark; Brett Hull is the most recent occurrence, having done so in 1990–91. Wayne Gretzky (three times) and Hull (twice) are the only players with multiple official 50-in-50 accomplishments.

Official 50-in-50 scorers

Maurice Richard
: 50 in 50 games (50-in-50)

Maurice Richard of the Montreal Canadiens was the first player in NHL history to score 50 goals in one season. He scored his 50th goal on March 18, 1945, in the 50th (and final) game of the 1944–45 NHL season on goalie Harvey Bennett of the Boston Bruins.

Besides Richard's 50-in-50 feat, he also led the NHL in goals on four other occasions and was the league's first career 500-goal scorer. In recognition of his achievements, the NHL created an annual award in 1999, the Maurice "Rocket" Richard Trophy, which was donated by the Montreal Canadiens, to be presented to the top goalscorer in the league.

Richard's 50-goal season was the last until Bernie Geoffrion scored 50 goals in the 1960–61 season, also with the Canadiens. When Bobby Hull finally broke the single-season goal record with 54 goals in 1965–66, fans of the then-retired Richard, noting that Hull was playing in a 70-game schedule, demanded that the NHL continue to recognize Richard's record. Hull's fans countered that Richard had achieved his record during World War II, during which many NHLers enlisted in the military. (Richard, who was notoriously prone to injury throughout his career, was deemed unfit for service.) Additionally, the counterargument noted Richard's failure to match the record in peacetime, with the caliber of the NHL not similarly hindered, even though he played in eleven 70-game seasons.

The NHL awarded Hull the record, while at the same time recognizing Richard as the first, and to that point only, player to score 50 goals in 50 games, firmly establishing the achievement into NHL lore.

Mike Bossy
: 50 in 50 games (50-in-50)

In the 1980–81 season, Mike Bossy of the New York Islanders became only the second player to score 50 goals in 50 games, 36 years after Richard had done so. Bossy's quest for the milestone was heavily covered by the hockey press, as Bossy was unofficially competing with Charlie Simmer of the Los Angeles Kings to be the first to accomplish it since Richard. Their "competition" was intense during late January 1981, with both players participating in their 50th game on January 24, 1981: Simmer started the day with 46 goals and Bossy 48. Simmer had a hat trick against Boston, giving him 49 goals in 50 games, barely missing the mark. Making his game against the Quebec Nordiques particularly dramatic, Bossy was scoreless for much of the game but beat goaltender Ron Grahame twice within the final five minutes. He could have had 51 goals in 50 games, but passed the puck back to Bryan Trottier because he felt it was the right play and had already achieved his goal of 50 goals in 50 games.  Bossy finished the season with 68 goals in 79 games played while Simmer would finish with 56 goals in 64 games.

Wayne Gretzky
: 61 in 50 games (50-in-39)
: 61 in 50 games (50-in-42)
: 53 in 50 games (50-in-49)

Wayne Gretzky of the Edmonton Oilers broke the 50-in-50 mark less than a full year after Bossy had tied Richard. In Gretzky's 38th game of the 1981-82 season, he scored four goals, giving him 45 on the season. In his next game, on December 30, 1981, he scored a rare five goals in one game against the Philadelphia Flyers, the fifth being an empty-net goal with three seconds left in the game, to give him the record of 50 goals in 39 games. He had 50 goals before any other player had scored 30, and would finish the season with an NHL-record 92 goals, having participated in all 80 of the Oilers games.  It is important to note that Joe Malone had 44 goals in the NHL's first season of 20 games.

Gretzky went on to score 50 goals within 50 games twice more in his career. In 1983–84, he scored his 50th goal in the team's 42nd game, on January 7, 1984, and finished the season with the second highest single-season total with 87 goals in 74 games. Gretzky's 50th goal was an empty-net goal that put the Oilers up 5–3 in a win over the Hartford Whalers at home. It was also Gretzky's third goal of the game, completing a hat trick. Also in 1983–84, Gretzky accumulated the fastest 50 goals recorded over consecutive games at any point of a season when he scored 50 goals over 34 consecutive games from December 14, 1983 through March 11, 1984.

In 1984–85, he scored his 50th in the team's 49th game, ending the season with 73 goals in 80 games. Gretzky's 50th goal came on January 26, 1985 (his 24th birthday), on the first of three goals he scored in a 6–3 win over the Pittsburgh Penguins, beating goaltender Denis Herron. It was the third time Gretzky scored 50 goals within 50 games, and the third time his 50-in-50 goal was achieved with a hat trick.

Mario Lemieux
: 54 in 50 games (50-in-46)

Mario Lemieux of the Pittsburgh Penguins was the next player to score 50 goals in 50 or fewer games, achieving the feat on January 20, 1989. Lemieux's 50th goal came in game 46 of the team's schedule against the Winnipeg Jets and goaltender Pokey Reddick, which was Lemieux's 44th game of the season. Lemieux finished the season with the fourth highest single season total with 85 goals in 76 games.

Brett Hull
: 52 in 50 games (50-in-49)
: 50 in 50 games (50-in-50)

Brett Hull scored 50 goals in 50 games or fewer twice in his career for the St. Louis Blues. Hull first did it in the 1990–91 season when he scored his 50th goal, and second of the game, against rookie goalie Dave Gagnon of the Detroit Red Wings on January 25, 1991, in the Blues' 49th game. Hull finished the season with the third highest single season total with  86 goals in 78 games played.

His second time, the most recent season the feat was achieved, was during the subsequent 1991–92 season. On January 28, 1992, Hull scored his 50th goal against goalie Kelly Hrudey in game number 50, a 3–3 tie in Los Angeles. He ended the season with 70 goals in 73 games.

Near misses
He finished his season with 54 goals in 65 games. Although the elder Hull never reached the 50-in-50 mark, his son Brett (see above), did reach the 50-in-50 mark twice in his career.
In Simmer's 50th game, he had a hat trick to bring his goal total from 46 to 49. Simmer and Mike Bossy (see above) were involved in an exciting day-by-day-by-day "competition", in late January of 1981, to achieve 50-in-50.
He finished with 70 goals in 79 games.

50 in player's (not team's) first 50

While not an official record, the following players scored fifty goals in or before the 50th game they played in a single season, but outside of their team's first 50 games, due to the player having missed some of his team's first 50 games due to injury, disciplinary action, or other reasons.

Jari Kurri scored his 50th goal in his 50th game of the season, during the 53rd game of the 1984–85 Edmonton Oilers season
Alexander Mogilny scored his 50th goal in his 46th game of the season, during the 53rd game of the 1992–93 Buffalo Sabres season
Mario Lemieux:
 scored his 50th goal in his 48th game of the season, during the 72nd game of the 1992–93 Pittsburgh Penguins season
 scored his 50th goal in his 50th game of the season, during the 59th game of the 1995–96 Pittsburgh Penguins season
Cam Neely scored his 50th goal in his 44th game of the season, during the 66th game of the 1993–94 Boston Bruins season

World Hockey Association
Bobby Hull, despite having never reached 50-in-50 during his NHL career, did earn a 50-in-50 season in 1974–75 with the Winnipeg Jets of the World Hockey Association. Hull's accomplishment made him the first player to reach the mark in any professional hockey league since Maurice Richard's 50-in-50 season in 1944–45. Hull had 47 goals through 49 games before recording a hat trick in his 50th game to reach the milestone.

Anders Hedberg, while also playing for the Jets, broke the record in 1976–77. He scored 51 goals in 49 games, becoming the first NHL or WHA player to score 50 goals in fewer than 50 games. He finished with 70 goals in 68 games.

Notes

References
National Hockey League Official Guide & Record Book 2005, published by Dan Diamond & Associates, Toronto, Ontario, Canada.
nhl.com
Beckett Hockey Monthly, issue #50, December 1994.

External links
 Gretzky scores 50 in 39

Ice hockey terminology
National Hockey League history
Goals in 50 games